Deep Blue Sea is a hat designed by Australian milliner, Ann-Maree Willett, which is made from Australian wool felt and set with 26 precious opals from Lightning Ridge, weighing a total of 1447.5 carats.

Deep Blue Sea was the feature piece of the ‘Climate’ series of hats that launched Willett's international millinery career. It contains more Lightning Ridge precious opal than has been brought together on any other wearable item and became famous as “the million-dollar opal hat”, then later as “the most valuable hat ever offered at public auction.”

History

In 2007, milliner Ann-Maree Willett was invited to represent Australia with a collection of hats at Corso Como design centre in Milan, Italy. The collection, ‘Climate’, comprised a series of hats inspired by Australia's natural environments and earned Willett one of the few Churchill Fellowships  to be awarded for design in Australia, as well as a relationship with famed Italian company Borsellino. The centrepiece of this collection, Deep Blue Sea was designed and manufactured as an item of runway or catwalk couture - a wearable sculpture rather than an everyday item.

Deep Blue Sea was inspired by the Great Barrier Reef, the largest coral reef system on Earth, located off the coast of Queensland in north-east Australia. To create the hat, Willett collaborated with opal miners Vicki and Peter Drackest of Down to Earth Opals, at Lightning Ridge in NSW, Australia and master goldsmith Gerd Gerald Schulz, also of Lightning Ridge and formerly from Idar-Oberstein in Germany, a city famous as a gemstone centre.

Boasting 28 precious opals that weighed a total of 1486.34 carats and were custom mounted in 337.5 grams of sterling silver and 18 carat yellow gold, Deep Blue Sea had a retail value in excess of $1 million. It became widely known as “the million-dollar hat."

Following its debut in Milan in February 2007, Deep Blue Sea was shown at the L'Oréal Melbourne Fashion Festival in March 2007, then the Australian Masters of Fashion Awards in July 2007, followed by a national tour of Australia. In February 2008, two of the opals on the hat were sold, leaving 26 opals weighing 1447.5 carats. The hat was exhibited again at the Australian Opal Exhibition in July 2008, then at the International Opal Jewlery Design Awards in July 2009.

Materials

Deep Blue Sea is made of Australian wool felt on a wire armature and features 26 carved natural precious opals set amidst swaying feathers. The felt has been hand blocked into cups representing coral polyps.

Each of the opals has been hand-carved by either Daniela Labiate or Christine Roussel, multi-award-winning master opal carvers regarded as world leaders in their craft. Opal types represented include black opal, dark opal and crystal opal. The opals are mounted in custom-made settings engineered and manufactured by Gerd Gerald Schulz using metals including sterling silver and 18 carat yellow gold.

Couture context
Blue Sea is a flamboyant statement piece; it is millinery theatre, in the tradition of sensational hat couture. Its primary innovation is in incorporating more than 1400 carats of high-value precious Australian opal, in a full spectrum of colours and hand-carved into unique sculptural shapes, into couture millinery and fashion.

Deep Blue Sea drew media attention for its extravagance and for its high value both as a hat and as wearable precious opal. In so doing it joined the ranks of the world's most expensive hats, alongside works such as Louis Mariette's platinum-and-diamond ‘Chapeau amour’, David Shilling's diamond, pearl and ruby encrusted hat formerly recognized by the Guinness Book of World Records as the most expensive hat ever, and Brent Black's ‘The Hat’, woven by Simon Espial.

See also

 Opal
 Millinery
 Hat making

References

Individual hats
Hats
Fashion accessories
2007 in fashion
Australian fashion